The 33rd (Western) Anti-Aircraft Brigade was an air defence formation of Anti-Aircraft Command of the Territorial Army, part of the British Army, formed shortly before the outbreak of the Second World War. It defended Merseyside and West Lancashire during The Blitz.

Origin
The 33rd (Western) Anti-Aircraft Group (later Brigade) was formed on 1 November 1936 at the Drill Hall, Chester, as part of 2nd AA Division, with the following AA units of the Royal Artillery (RA) and Royal Engineers (RE) under command:
 65th (The Manchester Regiment) Anti-Aircraft Brigade RA (TA) – Heavy Anti-Aircraft (HAA) unit formed at Hulme in 1936 by conversion of 6th/7th Battalion Manchester Regiment
 181, 182, 183, 196 AA Batteries
 38th (The King's Regiment) Anti-Aircraft Battalion, RE (TA) – Searchlight (S/L) unit formed at Liverpool in 1936 by conversion of 6th (Rifles) Battalion, King's Regiment (Liverpool)
 350, 351, 352, 353 AA Companies
 39th (The Lancashire Fusiliers) Anti-Aircraft Battalion, RE (TA) – S/L unit formed at Salford in 1936 by conversion of 7th Battalion, Lancashire Fusiliers
 354, 355, 356, 357 AA Companies
 41st (The North Staffordshire Regiment) Anti-Aircraft Battalion, RE (TA) –  S/L unit formed at Stoke-on-Trent in 1936 by conversion of 5th Battalion, North Staffordshire Regiment
 362, 363, 364, 365 AA Companies
 62nd (4th Bn The Loyal (North Lancashire) Regiment) Searchlight Regiment – S/L unit formed at Preston in 1938 by conversion of 4th Battalion, Loyal Regiment (North Lancashire)
 435, 436, 437, S/L Batteries

The 33rd AA Brigade was reassigned to 4th AA Division when that formation was created in Western Command on 1 September 1938. AA Command took over all TA air defences in 1939. From its formation, 33 AA Bde was commanded by Brigadier R.S. Ellis. By early 1939 its headquarters was at 'Crossacres', Woolton, Liverpool.

Second World War

Mobilisation
AA Command mobilised in August 1939, and its units were already at their war stations on the outbreak of war on 3 September 1939. 33rd AA Brigade was responsible for the air defence of Liverpool and West Lancashire, controlling the following units:

 70th (3rd West Lancashire) AA Regiment, RA – HAA unit formed in 1937 by conversion of 89th (3rd West Lancashire) Field Brigade, RA
 HQ at Tramway Road, Aigburth, Liverpool
 211 (13th West Lancashire) AA Battery at Aigburth
 212 (27th West Lancashire) AA Battery at Aigburth
 216 (14th West Lancashire) AA Battery at Widnes
 309 AA Battery at Bootle, Liverpool
 81st AA Regiment, RA – HAA unit formed in 1938 by conversion of 60th (6th Cheshire & Shropshire) Medium Brigade, RA
 HQ, 253, 254 (Cheshire) AA Batteries at Stockport
 255 (Cheshire) AA Battery at Stalybridge
 93rd AA Regiment, RA – New HAA unit raised in 1939
 HQ, 288, 289 AA Batteries at Oxton, Birkenhead
 267 (Wirral) AA Battery at West Birkenhead – from 70th (3rd West Lancs) AA Rgt
 290 AA Battery at Chester
 38th (The King's Regiment) AA Battalion, RE – As above
 HQ, 350, 351, 352, 353 AA Companies at Liverpool
 62nd (4th Bn Loyals) Searchlight Regiment – As above
 HQ, 435, 436, 437 S/L Batteries at Preston
 33rd AA Brigade Company, Royal Army Service Corps (RASC)

Phoney War and Battle of Britain
During the early part of the war the brigade's searchlight regiments were transferred to other formations and were replaced by new HAA and Light Anti-Aircraft (LAA) regiments. By the end of the Battle of Britain 33 AA Bde had the following units under command:
 103 HAA Regiment – formed May 1940
 106 HAA Regiment – formed August 1940
 33 LAA Regiment (132 LAA Battery) – from Western Command at Liverpool
 42 LAA Regiment – formed September 1939 from batteries of 17 and 36 LAA Regts
 Part of 65 LAA Regiment – formed November 1940

The Blitz
While the Battle of Britain raged over the skies of Southern England by day, there were also night raids on industrial cities, and Liverpool was heavily attacked for four nights in a row from 28 August. The night raids continued into the following Spring, during which period the city and its docks along the Mersey became the most heavily bombed area of Britain outside London. The campaign became known as the Liverpool Blitz, with particularly heavy attacks at Christmas 1940 (the Christmas Blitz), in April 1941, and again in May (the May Blitz).

Order of Battle 1940–41
By the end of the Blitz the brigade had the following units under command:
 1st HAA Rgt – Regular Army mobile regiment, transferred from 1st AA Bde at Crewe; part of War Office Reserve
 1, 2, 17 HAA Btys
 1 HAA Rgt Signals Section, Royal Corps of Signals (RCS)
 1 HAA Rgt Section, RASC
 1 HAA Rgt Workshop, Royal Army Ordnance Corps
 93rd HAA Rgt
 267, 288, 289, 290 HAA Btys
 103rd HAA Rgt
 322, 323, 324 HAA Btys
 420 Bty (joined between 27 June and 11 July 1941)
 107th HAA Rgt – new unit formed September 1940, partly from 103rd HAA Rgt
 334, 335, 337, 390 HAA Btys
 33rd LAA Rgt
 67, 68, 132 LAA Btys
 4th AA 'Z' Rgt – new unit equipped with Z Battery rocket projectors, formed in 4 AA Division September 1940
 104, 108, 122, 132, 139 Z Btys

Mid-War

The Blitz ended in May 1941, but occasional raids continued. Newly formed units joining AA Command were increasingly 'mixed' ones into which women of the Auxiliary Territorial Service were integrated. Some of these were armed with Z Battery rocket projectiles that were partly manned by members of the Home Guard. At the same time, experienced units were posted away for service overseas. This continual turnover of units accelerated in 1942 with the preparations for Operation Torch and the need to relocate guns to counter the Baedeker Blitz and the Luftwaffes hit-and-run attacks against South Coast towns.

Order of Battle 1941–42
During this period the division was composed as follows (temporary detachments omitted):
 1st HAA Rgt – as above; to Northern Ireland July 1941
 93rd HAA Rgt – as above; to 44 AA Bde June 1942
 267, 288, 289 HAA Btys
 95th HAA Rgt – joined September 1942; left for India October 1942
 204, 293, 240 HAA Btys
 103rd HAA Rgt – as above; left for mobile training May 1942
 322, 323, 324 HAA Btys
 420 HAA Bty – joined July 1941; left April 1942
 107th HAA Rgt – as above; left December 1941
 117th HAA Rgt – joined autumn, to 70 AA Bde December 1941, returned May, left for Orkney and Shetland Defences (OSDEF) late August 1942
 370, 371 HAA Btys
 358 Bty – joined May, left July 1942
 369, 392 HAA Btys – left early August 1942
 137th (Mixed) HAA Rgt – new unit formed November, joined December 1941, to 1 AA Group October 1942
 476, 481 (M) HA Btys
 477 (M) HAA Bty – to 142nd (Mixed) HAA Rgt January 1942
 487 (M) HAA Bty – from 142nd (M) HAA Rgt January 1942

 149th (Mixed) HAA Rgt – new unit formed February, joined April 1942
 506, 507, 512 (M) HAA Btys
 154th (Mixed) HAA Rgt – new unit formed March, joined May 1942
 522, 526 (M) HAA Btys
 560 (M) HAA Bty – joined June 1942
 550 (M) HAA Bty – joined August 1942
29th LAA Rgt – joined autumn 1941, to 10 AA Division February 1942
 108, 121, 237 LAA Btys
 33rd LAA Rgt – as above; to 2 AA Division autumn 1941
 63rd LAA Rgt – from 70 AA Bde August  1942
 188, 189, 190, 457 LAA Btys
 98th LAA Rgt – new unit formed December 1941, joined February, to 5 AA Division May 1942
 304, 305, 306, 481 LAA Btys
 134th LAA Rgt – new unit formed February, joined June, to 57 AA Bde August 1942
 192, 275, 287 LAA Btys
 230 LAA Bty – left July 1942
 475 LAA Bty – joined July 1942
 4th AA 'Z' Rgt – as above; to 70 AA Bde summer, rejoined autumn 1941, to 57 AA Bde August 1942
 194, 132, 139, 172 Z Btys
 33 AA Brigade Signal Office Mixed Sub-Section (part of No 2 Company, 4 AA Division Mixed Signal Unit, RCS)

Later war
A reorganisation of AA Command in October 1942 saw the AA divisions disbanded and replaced by a smaller number of AA Groups more closely aligned with the organisation of RAF Fighter Command. 33 AA Brigade came under a new 4 AA Group covering North West England and the West Midlands.

Order of Battle 1942–44

By this time the brigade was composed solely of HAA regiments following the redeployment of LAA guns to the South Coast. It was only in early 1943 that the brigade was reinforced:
 93rd HAA Rgt – returned by October 1942; left for Middle East Forces (MEF) by mid-March 1943
 267, 288, 289, 290 HAA Btys
 149th (M) HAA Rgt – to 53 AA Bde May 1943
 506, 507, 512, 587 (M) HAA Btys
 154th (M) HAA Rgt – to 2 AA Group October 1943
 522, 526, 590 (M) HAA Btys
 550 (M) HAA Bty – left December 1942
 552 (M) HAA Bty – joined January 1943
 157th (M) HAA Rgt – from 2 AA Group October 1943
 505, 539, 550, 551 (M) HAA Btys
 179th (M) HAA Rgt – from 2 AA Group October 1943
 584, 606, 607, 641 (M) HAA Btys
 184th (M) HAA Rgt – new unit formed November 1942, joined April 1943; to 44 AA Bde by August 1943
 616, 617, 625, 627 (M) HAA Btys
 190th (M) HAA Rgt – new unit formed January 1943, joined May 1943
 642, 664, 665, 667 (M) HAA Btys
 4th (M) AA 'Z' Rgt – returned May 1943
 104, 132, 214 Z Btys
 230 Z Bty – left end 1943
 14th (M) AA 'Z' Rgt  – from 1 AA Group May 1943
 108, 172, 201, 202, 226 Z Btys

Order of Battle 1944
In March 1944 the number of brigade HQs in 4 AA Group was reduced, and 33 AA Bde HQ was temporarily given additional responsibilities until these units were redistributed, mainly to the south of England to cover the embarkation ports for Operation Overlord:
 157th (M) HAA Rgt – as above
 159th (M) HAA Rgt – joined March, to 6 AA Group August 1944
 542, 543, 563, 614 (M) HAA Btys
 167th (M) HAA Rgt – joined March 1944; to 1 AA Group May 1944
 464, 562, 610 (M) HAA Btys
 179th (M) HAA Rgt – as above; to 2 AA Group May 1944
 190th (M) HAA Rgt – as above; to 61 AA Bde May 1944
 196th HAA Rgt – from OSDEF June 1944; disbanded July 1944
 351, 661, 662 HAA Btys
 88th LAA Rgt – joined March, to 2 AA Group May 1944
 178, 289, 293 LAA Btys
 4th AA Area Mixed Rgt – redesignated 1944
 13th AA Area Mixed Rgt – joined March 1944
 122, 203, 204, 205, 216 Z Btys
 14th AA Area Mixed Rgt – redesignated 1944

By October 1944, AA Command was being forced to release manpower to 21st Army Group fighting in North West Europe and 33 AA was reduced to one HAA regiment (157th; replaced by 169th – 566, 571, 576 (M) HAA Btys – in December) and its three AA Area Mixed regiments. At this date its own HQ establishment was 9 officers, 8 male other ranks and 25 members of the ATS, together with a small number of attached drivers, cooks and mess orderlies (male and female). In addition, the brigade had a Mixed Signal Office Section of 5 male other ranks and 19 ATS, which was formally part of the Group signal unit.

War's end
As the war neared its end there was a continued run-down of AA Command: 4 AA Group was disbanded in mid-March 1945, and 33 AA Bde transferred to the command of 5 AA Group. By this time, the brigade consisted solely of the rocket batteries of the three AA Area Mixed Rgts, and as these were disbanded in April. were disbanded during March and April, the brigade HQ soon had nothing to command. In May 1945, after the end of the war in Europe (VE Day), it was given control of 12 Area AA Maintenance HQ to administer the demobilisation process, with 37th (Tyne Electrical Engineers) and 69th (3rd City of London) S/L Rgts added in June. By November it was commanding a number of returned Regular Army units, together with others awaiting demobilisation:
 2nd HAA Rgt – returned from MEF
 16, 20, 28 HAA Btys
 4th HAA Rgt – returned from MEF
 5, 6, 258 HAA Btys
 7th HAA Rgt – returned from Siege of Malta
 10, 13, 27 HAA Btys
 130th HAA Rgt
 442, 443, 448 HAA Btys
 69th (3rd City of London) S/L Rgt
 354, 456, 457 S/L Btys

Postwar
On 1 January 1947, 33 AA Bde's Regular Army units reformed 9 AA Bde in Wales, while the TA portion was renumbered as 59th Anti-Aircraft Brigade in the reformed TA, constituting  part of 4 AA Group based at Warrington:  
 Brigade HQ  at Woolton, Liverpool
 360 HAA Regt – formerly 81 HAA Regt; see above
 493 HAA Regt, Birkenhead – formerly 93 HAA Regt; see above
 515 (Isle of Man) LAA Regt, Douglas –formerly 15 (Isle of Man) LAA Regt
 521 LAA Regt, Chester – formerly 21 LAA Regt; merged into 349 Regt 30 September 1950
 596 (South Lancashire) LAA Regt, St Helens – from 612 (South Lancashire) Infantry Regt RA, formerly 61 Searchlight Regt and originally 5th Battalion, South Lancashire Regiment

AA Command was disbanded on 10 March 1955 and there was a series of reductions and mergers in the TA's AA units. 59 AA Brigade was itself placed in suspended animation on 31 October 1955 and formally disbanded  on 31 December 1957.

A new brigade
A new 33rd AA Bde was formed on 1 November 1955 at Shepherd's Bush, London, by redesignation of X AA Bde (formerly 63 AA Bde). It had no links with Western Command or Merseyside. This brigade was reorganised on 1 May 1961, becoming 33 Artillery Brigade in 56th (London) Division.

Footnotes

Notes

References
 Basil Collier, History of the Second World War, United Kingdom Military Series: The Defence of the United Kingdom, London: HM Stationery Office, 1957.
 Gen Sir Martin Farndale, History of the Royal Regiment of Artillery: The Years of Defeat: Europe and North Africa, 1939–1941, Woolwich: Royal Artillery Institution, 1988/London: Brasseys, 1996, .
 J.B.M. Frederick, Lineage Book of British Land Forces 1660–1978, Vol II, Wakefield, Microform Academic, 1984, .
 Monthly Army List.
 
 Norman E.H. Litchfield, The Territorial Artillery 1908–1988 (Their Lineage, Uniforms and Badges), Nottingham: Sherwood Press, 1992, .
 Sir Frederick Pile's despatch: "The Anti-Aircraft Defence of the United Kingdom from 28th July, 1939, to 15th April, 1945" London Gazette 18 December 1947
 Brig N.W. Routledge, History of the Royal Regiment of Artillery: Anti-Aircraft Artillery 1914–55, London: Royal Artillery Institution/Brassey's, 1994, .

Online sources
 British Army units from 1945 on
 British Military History
 Orders of Battle at Patriot Files
 The Royal Artillery 1939–45
 Graham Watson, The Territorial Army 1947

Military units and formations established in 1936
Air defence brigades of the British Army
Anti-Aircraft brigades of the British Army in World War II
B033
Military units and formations in Liverpool
Military units and formations disestablished in 1957